George P. Cossar State Park is a state park in the U.S. state of Mississippi located on the shores of Enid Lake approximately  north of Oakland off Mississippi Highway 32. The park is named for George Payne Cossar, Sr., a prominent Mississippi attorney in the 20th century.

Activities and amenities
The park features boating, waterskiing and fishing on  Enid Lake, 76 campsites, 13 camper cabins, visitors center, 18-hole disc golf course, 18-hole miniature golf course, picnic area, and a  nature trail.
The world record crappie was caught in Enid Lake in 1954. Most of the land around the lake and in nearby Holly Springs National Forest is open for hunting.

References

External links

George P. Cossar State Park Mississippi Department of Wildlife, Fisheries, and Parks

State parks of Mississippi
Protected areas of Yalobusha County, Mississippi